Mark Fyson (born 21 August 1981) is a British acrobatic gymnast competing at international level, winning  a bronze medal in the men's pairs discipline at the World Games in 2005, and a further bronze at the European Acrobatic Gymmnastics Championships, both in partnership with Chris Jones.

Later, Fyson partnered Edward Upcott to win bronze in the 2008 world championships men's pairs discipline in Glasgow, before retiring in 2009.

References

External links
 

British acrobatic gymnasts
Male acrobatic gymnasts
1981 births
People from Orpington
Living people
World Games bronze medalists
Competitors at the 2005 World Games
Medalists at the Acrobatic Gymnastics World Championships
21st-century British people